There are thirty-four medical schools in the United Kingdom that are recognised by the General Medical Council and where students can study for a medical degree. There are twenty-five such schools in England, five in Scotland, two in Wales and two in Northern Ireland.  All but Warwick Medical School, Swansea Medical School and Ulster University offer undergraduate courses in medicine.  The Bute Medical School (University of St Andrews) and Durham Medical School offer undergraduate pre-clinical courses only, with students proceeding to another medical school for clinical studies.  Although Oxford University and Cambridge University offer both pre-clinical and clinical courses in medicine, students who study pre-clinical medicine at one of these universities may move to another university for clinical studies. At other universities students stay at the same university for both pre-clinical and clinical work.

History of medical training
The first medical school in the United Kingdom was established at the University of Edinburgh in 1726. Medical education prior to this was based on apprenticeships and learning from observation. Professors of medicine did very little if any training of students. Few students graduated as physicians during this earlier period. 
 
The earliest example of this earlier style of medical training in Britain was in 1123 at St Bartholomew's Hospital, now part of Queen Mary, University of London. The first Chair of Medicine at a British university was established at the University of Aberdeen in 1497, although this was only filled intermittently and there were calls "for the establishment of a medical school" in 1787. 
Medical teaching has taken place erratically at the University of Oxford since the early 16th century, and its first Regius Professor of Physic was appointed in 1546. Teaching was reformed in 1833 and again in 1856, but the current medical school was not founded until 1936. The University of St Andrews established a Chair of Medicine in 1772, but did not have a medical school (at Dundee) until 1897.
The Linacre Readership in Medicine at the University of Cambridge was founded in 1524, and the Regius Professor of Physic was established in 1540. Teaching was reformed in 1829, but the current medical school was established in 1976. Teaching of apprentices was first recorded in 1561 at St Thomas's Hospital, London, and formalised between 1693 and 1709.

The University of Edinburgh Medical School was founded in 1726 and was the first formally established medical school in the UK. This was followed by Glasgow in 1744, although the school was without a teaching hospital until 1794.
The oldest medical school in England is St George's, University of London, which began formal teaching in 1751. In 1768 teaching at St Thomas's and Guy's hospitals in London was formalised with the foundation of the United Hospitals Medical School, which lasted until the foundation of a separate medical school at Guy's in 1825 (now both part of King's College London).
The London Hospital Medical College (LHMC) was founded in 1785 and is now part of Queen Mary, University of London's School of Medicine. In the first half of the 19th century, the newly founded university colleges in London opened teaching hospitals in 1834 (University College Hospital) and 1839 (King's College Hospital). The Middlesex Hospital Medical School (now part of UCL)
was also founded in this period, in 1835. The London School of Medicine for Women was founded in 1874, the first medical school in Britain to teach women (now part of UCL).

Outside of London and the universities, medical teaching began in Manchester in 1752 and lectures in Birmingham in 1767.  Medical schools in Manchester (1824), Birmingham (1825), Sheffield (1829), Leeds (1831), Bristol (1833), Newcastle (1834), Liverpool (1834), and Belfast (1835)
were formally established in the first half of the 19th century. Durham University introduced teaching by a Reader in Medicine from its opening in 1833, but had no medical school until the affiliation of the College of Medicine in Newcastle in 1854. In the later 19th century a medical school was established at Cardiff in 1893.

The Medical Act 1858 was a key development in the professionalising of medical practice and training, introducing the General Medical Council and the Medical Register.

20th and 21st century
The next expansion of medical schools began following the recommendations of the Royal Commission on Medical Education (1965–1968) (the Todd Report), which called for the immediate establishment of new schools in Southampton, Leicester and Nottingham to aid medical education in the United Kingdom; all were built between 1970 and 1980. Medical schools at Warwick (located in Coventry), Swansea, Keele (located in Stoke-on-Trent) and Hull (in partnership with York) eventually opened in the 1990s and early 21st century, as well as new medical schools at University of East Anglia (located in Norwich) Durham, Brighton and Sussex, and Plymouth and Exeter. 

Buckingham University, the oldest private university in England, opened University of Buckingham Medical School, a graduate entry medical school in 2015. University of Central Lancashire (UCLan) School of Medicine opened to medical students in 2015.

In 2018 Health Secretary, Jeremy Hunt, announced the creation of five new medical schools in Sunderland, Chelmsford, Canterbury, Lincoln and Lancashire.

Three medical schools were established in the 2020s, although UK government policy limited the numer of places funded for UK students.

Brunel Medical School at Brunel University London opened in 2021, admitting overseas students only.

Three Counties Medical School at the University of Worcester opens in September 2023.

Chester Medical School at the University of Chester will offer a postgraduate MB ChB degree course starting in 2024.

Historical medical schools

(Please note that in the tables below and noting the complexities described above in deciding what date some level of teaching became what we now recognise as a medical school, the establishment date generally reflects the formal commencement of the current medical school.)

England

Scotland

Wales

Northern Ireland

Overseas territories

See also
List of pharmacy schools in the United Kingdom
List of dental schools in the United Kingdom
Medical school in the United Kingdom

Notes and references 

Medical schools
United Kingdom
United Kingdom health-related lists